Esmeralda is a genus of flowering plants in the orchid family, Orchidaceae. It contains three recognized species, native to southern China, the Himalayas, and northern Southeast Asia.

Esmeralda bella Rchb.f. - Tibet, Yunnan, Myanmar, Nepal, Thailand, Assam, Bhutan
Esmeralda cathcartii (Lindl.) Rchb.f. - Nepal, Assam, Bhutan, Sikkim
Esmeralda clarkei Rchb.f. - Yunnan, Myanmar, Nepal, Thailand, Assam, Bhutan, Hainan, Vietnam

See also 
 List of Orchidaceae genera

References 

 Pridgeon, A.M., Cribb, P.J., Chase, M.A. & Rasmussen, F. eds. (1999). Genera Orchidacearum 1. Oxford Univ. Press.
 Pridgeon, A.M., Cribb, P.J., Chase, M.A. & Rasmussen, F. eds. (2001). Genera Orchidacearum 2. Oxford Univ. Press.
 Pridgeon, A.M., Cribb, P.J., Chase, M.A. & Rasmussen, F. eds. (2003). Genera Orchidacearum 3. Oxford Univ. Press
 Berg Pana, H. 2005. Handbuch der Orchideen-Namen. Dictionary of Orchid Names. Dizionario dei nomi delle orchidee. Ulmer, Stuttgart

External links 
 
 

Aeridinae
Orchids of Asia
Vandeae genera
Historically recognized angiosperm genera